Ryon Bell (born 26 April 1978 in Victoria, Canada), is a Canadian International motorcycle trials rider. Bell was Canadian Expert Champion in 2000.

Biography
In 1993 Bell came close to taking his first NATC title when despite taking wins in Washington, a double in New Mexico, and a win in Texas, he was runner-up in the NATC Highschool championship to Matt Moore of Oklahoma. 

In 1998 Bell finished second in the NATC Champ class behind factory Beta rider Geoff Aaron.

Bell had a good 2000 season. He won all four rounds of the Canadian Expert Championship and becoming National Champion. He contested the NATC Champ series. In Minnesota Bell was second to Ray Peters on day one, with reigning champ Aaron finishing 4th and on day two he took the win ahead of Aaron. He took three wins, but was beaten to the title again by Aaron.

In 2001 the addition of Belgian rider Fred Crosset to the NATC Champ class made it harder to win, but Bell won once in New York. The season ended Crosset, Aaron, Bell. 2002 was almost a repeat of the 2001 season, with the season standing the same.

For 2003 Bell took runner-up behind Aaron winning in Washington. As the season had approached Rhode Island Bell was showing good form, winning day two. He then edged out Aaron in Wyoming, but Aaron's 2nd place was enough to take the title.

In 2004, he again came second to Aaron.

National Trials Championship Career

Honors
 Ute Cup winner 1999
 Canadian Expert Trials Champion 2000
 El Trial de Espana winner 2002

Related Reading
NATC Trials Championship
FIM Trial European Championship
FIM Trial World Championship

References 

1978 births
Living people
American motorcycle racers
Motorcycle trials riders